Ty Walker may refer to:

Ty Walker (basketball) (born 1989), American basketball player
Ty Walker (snowboarder) (born 1997), American snowboarder